The 1984 Tennents' Sixes was the first staging of the indoor 6-a-side football tournament taking place at Coasters Arena in Falkirk on 16 and 17 January and televised on BBC Scotland.

9 teams from the 1983-84 Scottish Premier Division season competed in the inaugural championship with Aberdeen absent and each club received £3000 for appearing.

The tournament had 3 group winners plus the best runners-up qualify to the semi-finals and Rangers beat Dundee in the final.

Group stage

Group 1

Group 2

Group 3

Semi-finals

Final

References

External links
Scottish Football Historical Archive

Tennent's Sixes
Football in Falkirk (council area)
January 1984 sports events in the United Kingdom
Tennents' Sixes